Bhairavi Desai (pronounced BY-ra-vee They-SIGH) is a founding member of the New York Taxi Workers Alliance, a union representing approximately 15,000 taxi drivers in New York City.

She is known as a progressive social activist, including her efforts for social justice for the "Cuba, Palestine, and El Salvador solidarity movements".

Early life 
Desai was born in Gujarat, India, and came with her parents to Harrison, New Jersey, when she was six years old. Her father was a lawyer in India, but was unable to find work in the legal profession, consequently finding work at a grocery store.

She received a degree in Women's Studies from Rutgers University and following that, worked at Manavi, the South Asian women's organization in New Jersey that worked with victims of domestic violence.

She then moved to working for the rights of Asian workers by joining the Committee Against Asian American Violence in 1996. In 1998, she and others set up the NYTWA with an initial membership of 700 workers.

She currently resides in the Bronx, where her husband Victor Salazar, is also a union activist.

Work with taxi drivers 
Her first success came in May 1998 when the first strike in thirty years was called by the yellow cabs. Over 90% of New York taxi drivers joined the strike to protest against unfair regulations, medical checkups and health insurance for the drivers. Despite being a woman in an overwhelmingly male-dominated industry, many taxi drivers respect her.

Desai and the TWA were involved in initiating new regulations (2011) by the New York City Taxi and Limousine Commission regarding the lucrative business of rooftop ads on taxis. These highly visible and mobile advertisements generate income for the medallion owners but are considered a burden by the taxi owners who work for them: drivers have never had a voice in their selection nor a stake in their revenue. In recent years, many of the rooftop signs have caused controversy by promoting businesses in adult entertainment. According to the new act, drivers who own their own vehicles are now permitted ultimate veto power over any advertisements that they can "reasonably" regard as "inappropriate". In a longer view, Desai anticipates that this act serves as "a step toward ultimately requiring medallion owners to give some of the revenue from taxi-roof advertisements to vehicle owners."

Other activities 
Desai received the Ford Foundation Leadership for a Changing World Award in 2005. She was a regular contributor to forums and events at the Marxist Brecht Forum.

See also 
 Indians in the New York City metropolitan area
 Taxicabs of New York City

References

External links 
 Bhairavi Desai materials in the South Asian American Digital Archive (SAADA)
 Bhairavi Desai at CUNY Graduate Center's Activist Women's Voices oral history project – finding aid

Indian emigrants to the United States
People from Harrison, New Jersey
People from Jersey City, New Jersey
Activists from New York City
Rutgers University alumni
Living people
Activist Women's Voices oral history project
American people of Gujarati descent
American people of Indian descent
American businesspeople
Businesswomen from Gujarat
Year of birth missing (living people)
Asian-American trade unionists
21st-century American women